Vulcan may refer to:

Mythology
 Vulcan (mythology), the god of fire, volcanoes, metalworking, and the forge in Roman mythology

Arts, entertainment and media

Film and television
 Vulcan (Star Trek), name of a fictional race and their home planet and language in the Star Trek franchise
 Black Vulcan, a fictional African American superhero on the animated series Super Friends
 Kamen Rider Vulcan, a character in the series Kamen Rider Zero-One
 Vulcan, a fictional planet in the Doctor Who season The Power of the Daleks

Print
 Vulcan (Fleetway), a 1975–1976 IPC Comic
 Vulcan (DC Comics), a fictional character
 Vulcan (Marvel Comics), a fictional supervillain
 Vulcan!, a 1978 Star Trek novel by Kathleen Sky
 The Vulcan, a magazine from various organizations within the Young Fine Gael
 Vulcan, a gay pornography magazine, made famous in a High Court test case by serial killer Dennis Nilsen
 Vulcan, a fictional series of artificial intelligences (Vulcan 2 and 3) in Vulcan's Hammer
 Vulcan (comics), several meanings

Other arts, entertainment and media
 Vulcan statue, the world's largest cast-iron statue and the city symbol of Birmingham, Alabama, US
 Vulcan (EP), an EP by Snake River Conspiracy
 Vulcan, an album by Chris Wood
 Vulcan Raven, a character in the Metal Gear Solid video games
 Aegis Vulcan, a spaceship in the Star Citizen video game

Volcanoes
 Vulcano or Vulcan, an active volcano island in Italy
 Vulcan (volcano), a volcano in Papua New Guinea
 Vulcan (inactive volcano), a dormant volcano in Albuquerque, New Mexico, US

Places

Canada
 Vulcan, Alberta, a town
 Vulcan Airport
 Vulcan County, a municipal district
 RCAF Station Vulcan, a former Commonwealth and RCAF training station

Romania
 Vulcan, Brașov, a commune in Brașov County
 Vulcan, Hunedoara, a city in Hunedoara County
 Vulcan, a village in Apold Commune, Mureș County
 Vulcan, a village in Ciuruleasa Commune, Alba County
 Blăjeni-Vulcan, a village in Blăjeni Commune, Hunedoara County
 Buceș-Vulcan, a village in Buceș Commune, Hunedoara County

United States
 Vulcan, Colorado, a ghost town, where Vulcanite was discovered
 Vulcan, Michigan
 Vulcan, Missouri
 Vulcan, West Virginia

Elsewhere
 Vulcan Planum, a plain on Pluto's moon Charon

Science and technology
 Vulcan (hypothetical planet), a hypothetical planet once thought to be between Mercury and the Sun
 Vulcanoid, a hypothetical population of asteroids between Mercury and the Sun
 Vulcan (programming language), a programming language, now known as dBase
 Vulcan laser, a laser at the Rutherford Appleton Laboratory, England
 Vulcan palm (Brighamia insignis), a plant

Military
 Avro Vulcan, a British delta-winged strategic bomber
 , various ships
 USS Vulcan, three ships
 M163 VADS (Vulcan Air Defense System), a US self-propelled, antiaircraft Gatling gun
 M167 VADS (Vulcan Air Defense System), a US Army towed, short-range, antiaircraft Gatling gun
 M61 Vulcan, a 20mm six-barreled Gatling gun
 Vulcan M-11-9, a semiautomatic, closed-bolt pistol manufactured by Vulcan Armament

Organisations
 Vulcan (Turku shipyard), a former shipyard in Turku, Finland
 Crichton-Vulcan, an abandoned shipyard in Turku, Finland
 Stettiner Vulcan AG, a former shipyard in Hamburg, Germany
 Vulcan (motor vehicles), a car and commercial vehicle manufacturer based in Southport, England
 Vulcan Foundry, a former British locomotive builder, and "Vulcan village" workers cottages
 Vulcan Iron Works, several mechanical engineering companies in the nineteenth century in England and the US
 Vulcan Materials Company, a construction materials company headquartered in Birmingham, Alabama, US
 Vulcan Inc., an investment company formed by Microsoft co-founder Paul Allen
 Vulcan Software, a British computer game company
 Vulcan Capital Management, a US private equity firm

Sports
 Vulcan changeup, a type of baseball pitch
 Auckland Vulcans, a rugby league team that plays in the NSW Cup
 Birmingham Vulcans, a 1975 World Football League team
 California Vulcans, the sports teams of California University of Pennsylvania
 The Vulcans, the athletic teams of the University of Hawaii at Hilo

Vehicles

Cars and motorcycles
 Aston Martin Vulcan, a 2015 sports car only for the racetrack
 Ford Vulcan engine, an automobile engine
 Kawasaki Vulcan, a series of cruiser-type motorcycles

Trains
 NZR RM class (Vulcan), a former type of railroad car found in preservation in New Zealand
 Vulcan (1874-1892), a South Devon Railway Buffalo class steam locomotives
 Vulcan (1951-1967), a BR 'Britannia' Class locomotive
 Vulcan, a British Rail Class 47 diesel locomotive no: D1676 (later 47090, 47623, 47843), used since April 1965

Other vehicles
 Vickers Vulcan, a biplane airliner of the 1920s
 Vulcan Centaur, a rocket launch system under development by the United Launch Alliance
 Vulcan (barge) (1819), the world's first all iron-hulled boat

Other uses
 Vulcan (surname), a surname
 Operation Vulcan, an Allied action in Tunisia during World War II
 The Vulcan, Cardiff, a former historic public house in Wales
 Vulcan Hotel (Saint Bathans), Saint Bathans, New Zealand
 The Vulcans, George W. Bush's foreign policy advisory team for the 2000 U.S. election
 Vulcan Nuclear Reactor Testing Establishment, in Dounreay, Scotland

See also
 Volcan (disambiguation)
 Vulcain (disambiguation)
 Vulcana (1875–1946), Welsh female bodybuilder
 Vulcanair, an Italian-based manufacturer of light twin-engined aircraft
 Vulcanization, a chemical process to improve the strength and durability of rubber
 Vulcanite, a rare copper telluride mineral
 Vulkan (disambiguation)